Richard Norris Wolfenden (1854-1926) was an English physician and oceanographer.

Life
Wolfenden was educated at Christ's College, Cambridge. He practised as a London physician, and lectured in physiology at the Charing Cross Hospital medical school. He was House Physician at the London Hospital and Senior Physician at the Throat Hospital, Golden Square, London. 
He founded and edited the Journal of Laryngology and Rhinology.

As well as his medical practice, Wolfenden also interested himself in oceanography.  
Together with George Herbert Fowler, Wolfenden founded the Challenger Society for Marine Science in 1903.

Works
 On infantile cerebral paralysis, 1886
 Studies in pathological anatomy, especially in relation to laryngeal neoplasms, 1888
 Copepoda, 1908
 Scientific and biological researches in the North Atlantic : conducted by the author on his yachts 'The Walwin' and 'The Silver Belle', 1909

References

Sources
J. Dundas-Grant, "In memoriam: R. Norris Wolfenden", Journal of laryngology and otology, 1926, pp. 833–834
D.M. Damkaer, "R. Norris Wolfenden, M.D.: the medical episode", Journal of laryngology and otology, 1989, 103: 1005-1013

1854 births
1926 deaths
19th-century English medical doctors
Alumni of Christ's College, Cambridge
English oceanographers
20th-century English medical doctors